Rabbi is a Jewish title.

Rabbi may also refer to:

Places
 Rabbi (river), a river in Italy
 Rabbi, Trentino, a municipality in Trentino, Italy

People
 Mose Solomon (1900-1966), the "Rabbi of Swat", American Major League Baseball player
 Rabbi Shergill, Indian Sufi singer/composer
 List of people called Rabbi

Other uses
 Rabbi (album), a 2004 Punjabi album
 Rabbi (date), a palm date cultivar
 Rabbi, a mentor
 Title for a Mandaean priest

See also
 The Rabbi (disambiguation)